Chile was one of the founding members of the South American Games participating in the very first edition held in La Paz, Bolivia in 1978. 

Chile is represented by the Chilean Olympic Committee and have host this event twice in 1986 and 2014 in the city of Santiago de Chile

Medal count

Medals by games

Medals by sport

References

South American Games